Impermanence is philosophical concept addressed in a variety of religions and philosophies.

Impermanence may refer to:

Music

Albums
 Impermanence (Meredith Monk album), 2008
 Impermanence (Peter Silberman album), 2017

Songs
 "Impermanence", by Architects on the album For Those That Wish to Exist
 "Impermanence", by Assemblage 23 on the album Compass
 "Impermanence", by Bryce Dessner and the Australian String Quartet on the album Impermanence/Disintegration
 "Impermanence", by Joep Beving on the album Prehension
 "Impermanence", by Major Parkinson on the album Twilight Cinema
 "Impermanence", by Max Cooper on the album Emergence
 "Impermanence", by Peter Silberman on the album Impermanence
 "Impermanence", by Ride on the album Weather Diaries